Frederick Raymond Parnell (June 24, 1868 – February 27, 1951) was an Ontario merchant and political figure. He represented St. Catharines in the Legislative Assembly of Ontario as a Conservative member in 1919.

He was born in Grantham Township, Ontario, the son of Lewis Parnell, and was educated in the township and in St. Catharines. Parnell operated a wholesale grocery business. He married Margaret Arbuthnot. Parnell was a member of the Board of Education and of the Water Commission. He also served as a member of the local militia during the 1880s and as a sergeant in the Home Guard during World War II. Parnell was elected to the provincial assembly in a 1919 by-election held after the death of Elisha Jessop. He was the first president of the Lincoln Historical Society and of the United Empire Loyalist Society. He served as president of the Historical
Society of St. Catharines from 1927 to 1935. He was a master in the local Orange Lodge and a prominent member of the local Masonic lodge. He died in St. Catharines.

External links 
Member's parliamentary history for the Legislative Assembly of Ontario
Historical Society of St. Catharines, December 2001 newsletter

1868 births
1951 deaths
Progressive Conservative Party of Ontario MPPs